Katueté is a town in the Canendiyú department of Paraguay. 

It's the only city that has all of the banks. More than Salto del Guairá.

It's very visited by brazilians going past the city, Most of are from Parana.

Sources 
World Gazeteer: Paraguay – World-Gazetteer.com

 Katueté, Katuete, Departamento de Canindeyú, Paraguay, at Mindat

Populated places in the Canindeyú Department